Nick Bussell (born April 1, 1983) is an American racing driver from Ionia, Michigan.

After karting, Bussell joined the Fran-Am 2000 North American Pro Championship series in 2003 where he finished 10th in points. He took most of 2004 off of racing while he worked in race car fabrication in Indianapolis. In 2005 he joined the Indy Pro Series with J. L. West Motorsports but switched teams to Vision Racing after six races. He completed all but two laps all season and finished 4th in points with a best finish of 2nd at Pikes Peak International Raceway. He returned to the series in 2006 to race for Cheever Racing. He finished 5th in points in 2006 with a best finish of 2nd in the season opener at Homestead Miami Speedway. According to his website, he and his manager attempted to find a team to race with in 2007 but were apparently unable to as Bussell has not competed in a professional race since the close of the 2006 Pro Series season.

External links
Nick Bussell Racing official website
IndyCar.com complete career statistics

1983 births
Living people
Indy Lights drivers
North American Formula Renault drivers
People from Ionia, Michigan
Racing drivers from Michigan

Vision Racing drivers
Cheever Racing drivers